Sitgreaves Mountain is a mountain peak located within Kaibab National Forest in Coconino County, Arizona. It is located between Flagstaff and Williams, Arizona and can be easily seen by drivers along Interstate 40. 

Like neighboring Kendrick Peak, this mountain is volcanic in origin, forming a part of the San Francisco Volcanic Field. It is a series of overlapping lava domes, characterized by numerous summits and false peaks. It is located along the same fault line that formed Kendrick Peak and Bill Williams Mountain.

References 

Mountains of Coconino County, Arizona